Group B of the 1999 Fed Cup Asia/Oceania Zone Group II was one of two pools in the Asia/Oceania Zone Group II of the 1999 Fed Cup. Three teams competed in a round robin competition, with the top two teams qualifying for the play-offs.

Tajikistan vs. Pakistan

Fiji vs. Syria

Tajikistan vs. Fiji

Pakistan vs. Syria

Tajikistan vs. Syria

Pakistan vs. Fiji

See also
Fed Cup structure

References

External links
 Fed Cup website

1999 Fed Cup Asia/Oceania Zone